Muhammad Naeem Khan was an inspector general of Khyber Pakhtunkhwa Police from 11 February 2019 to 2 January 2020.

References

Living people
IGPs of Khyber Pakhtunkhwa Police
Pakistani police officers
Year of birth missing (living people)